Ladyhawk is an album by Canadian indie rock band Ladyhawk, released in 2006.

The songs "Drunk Eyes" and "The Dugout" can be heard in the 2009 film The Thaw.

Track listing 
"48 Hours" – 2:01
"The Dugout" – 5:22
"My Old Jacknife" – 2:50
"Long 'Til the Morning" – 7:04
"Came in Brave" – 3:06
"Advice" – 3:48
"Sad Eyes/Blue Eyes" – 3:28
"Teenage Love Song" – 2:22
"Drunk Eyes" – 3:20
"New Joker" – 5:18

2006 albums
Ladyhawk (band) albums